Wasylów  is a village in the administrative district of Gmina Telatyn, within Tomaszów Lubelski County, Lublin Voivodeship, in eastern Poland.

Notable people
Nina Petrovna Khrushcheva, wife of Soviet leader Nikita Khrushchev

References

Villages in Tomaszów Lubelski County